The Billabong Pipe Masters, is an annual event of the Association of Surfing Professionals for 2017 World Surf League, it is the final event of the Triple Crown of Surfing.

This event was held from 8 to 20 December at Banzai Pipeline, Oahu (Hawaii, United States) and consisted of the world's best surfers competing for Champion of the renowned Banzai pipeline. Competing in the 2017 were Brazilians, Gabriel Medina, Filipe Toledo, Americans, Kelly Slater and John John Florence and Australian, Mick Fanning among many others. On 18 December 2017 John John Florence, the reigning World Champion and number 1 in the World, walked away as World Surf League World Champion, stating "To win at home is my dream".

Round 1

Round 2

Round 3

Round 4

Round 5

Quarter finals

Semi finals

Final

References

External links
 Official event website

Billabong Pipe Masters
2017 World Surf League